Skrjabillanidae is a family of nematodes belonging to the order Rhabditida.

Genera:
 Esocinema Moravec, 1977
 Kalmanmolnaria Sokolov, 2006
 Lucionema Moravec, Molnar & Szekely, 1998
 Molnaria Moravec, 1968
 Sinoichthyonema Wu, 1973
 Skrjabillanus Shigin & Shigina, 1958

References

Nematodes